Trichopterigia is a genus of moths in the family Geometridae erected by George Hampson in 1895.

Species
Trichopterigia adorabilis Yazaki, 1987
Trichopterigia adiopa Prout, 1958
Trichopterigia albipunctata Yazaki, 1993
Trichopterigia atrofasciata Yashimoto, 1995
Trichopterigia cerinaria Xue, 1992
Trichopterigia consobrinaria Leech, 1891
Trichopterigia costipunctaria Leech, 1897
Trichopterigia decorata Moore, 1888
Trichopterigia dejeani Prout, 1958
Trichopterigia fulvifasciata Yazaki, 1993
Trichopterigia hagna Prout, 1958
Trichopterigia harutai Yazaki, 1993
Trichopterigia illumina Prout, 1958
Trichopterigia kishidai Yazaki, 1987
Trichopterigia macularia Moore, 1868
Trichopterigia melanogramma Yazaki, 1993
Trichopterigia miantosticta Prout, 1958
Trichopterigia minuta Inoue, 1992
Trichopterigia nepalensis Yazaki, 1993
Trichopterigia nigrisculpta Warren, 1897
Trichopterigia nigronotata Warren, 1893
Trichopterigia nivocellata Bastelberger, 1911
Trichopterigia pilcheri Prout, 1958
Trichopterigia placida Yazaki, 1993
Trichopterigia rivularis Warren, 1893
Trichopterigia rivularis acidnias Prout, 1958
Trichopterigia rubripuncta Wileman, 1916
Trichopterigia rufinotata Butler, 1889
Trichopterigia sanguinipunctata Warren, 1893
Trichopterigia sphenorrhyma Prout, 1926
Trichopterigia superba Yazaki, 1993
Trichopterigia teligera Prout, 1958
Trichopterigia ustimargo Warren, 1896
Trichopterigia viridilineata Hashimoto, 1995
Trichopterigia yoshimotoi Yazaki, 1987

References

Larentiinae